Vecpiebalga Parish is an administrative unit of Cēsis Municipality  in the Vidzeme region of Latvia. It is one of the 21 parishes in this municipality. Before the administrative reform of 2021, Vecpiebalga Parish was one of the 5 parishes in the former Vecpiebalga Municipality. Before the administrative reform of 2009, Vecpiebalga Parish was one of the 21 parishes in the former Cēsis District. The territory of Vecpiebalga Parish Municipality is defined by law as a part of the region of Vidzeme.

Vecpiebalga Parish is the birthplace of the writers Reinis Kaudzīte, Matīss Kaudzīte and Kārlis Skalbe.

Towns, villages and settlements of Vecpiebalga Parish

References

Parishes of Latvia
Cēsis Municipality
Vidzeme